Manchester South was one of six parliamentary constituencies created in 1885 by the division of the Parliamentary Borough of Manchester, England.  It returned one Member of Parliament (MP) to the House of Commons of the Parliament of the United Kingdom, elected by the first-past-the-post voting system. The constituency was abolished in 1918.

Boundaries 
The constituency was created by the Redistribution of Seats Act 1885, and consisted of the following areas:
The part of the civil parish of Chorlton upon Medlock south of the centres of the following roads: Cavendish Street, Grosvenor Street, Upper Brook Street, Dover Street,  St. Leonards Street. (The remainder of the parish was included in the Manchester East constituency.)
The Local Government district of Moss Side
The Local Government District of Rusholme
The detached part of the parish of Gorton included within the former parliamentary borough.
The Hamlet of Kirkmanshulme (a detached part of the parish of Newton).

Redistribution
The seat was abolished in 1918, when the Representation of the People Act redrew constituencies throughout Great Britain and Ireland. Manchester's representation was increased to ten members of parliament, and the former Manchester South was divided between the areas of the new Moss Side and Rusholme constituencies.

Members of Parliament

Election results

Elections in the 1880s

Elections in the 1890s

Elections in the 1900s

Elections in the 1910s

General Election 1914–15:

Another General Election was required to take place before the end of 1915. The political parties had been making preparations for an election to take place and by the July 1914, the following candidates had been selected; 
Unionist: Philip Glazebrook
Liberal:

References

Sources 
Election Results:
https://web.archive.org/web/20060520143104/http://www.manchester.gov.uk/elections/archive/gen1900.htm
https://web.archive.org/web/20060520143047/http://www.manchester.gov.uk/elections/archive/gen1945.htm
Viscount Emlyn:
http://yba.llgc.org.uk/AnaServer?ybawbo+1281713+aview.anv+v=av&l=e&show=1
Leifchild Stratten Leif-Jones:

South
Constituencies of the Parliament of the United Kingdom established in 1885
Constituencies of the Parliament of the United Kingdom disestablished in 1918